Shahrzad Seifi (born 1986 in Tehran, Iran), is an Iranian producer and actress. She was the executive producer and also played role in Shahram Mokri's feature films Fish & Cat which Won the Horizon Prize in Venice Film Festival (2013). She also produced Simulation and Killing the Eunuch Khan which were directed by Abed Abest. She is the founder and CEO of Hich Film film company. Her last film "Killing the Eunuch Khan" won the Slamdance Grand Jury Award (2022) and premiered at 21st Transilvania International Film Festival.

Filmography

References

External links

1986 births
Living people
Iranian film producers
Iranian actresses